Treial is an Estonian occupational surname meaning "turner" and "lathe operator". As of 1 January 2022, 151 men and 146 women in Estonia have the surname Treial. Treial is ranked as the 460th most common surname for men in Estonia, and the 548th most common surname for Estonian women. The surname Treial is most common in Järva County, where 6.07 per 10,000 inhabitants of the county bear the surname.

Notable people bearing the surname Treial include:

Henn Treial (1905–1941), journalist, editor and politician
Henri Treial (born 1992), volleyball player
Hugo Treial (1898–1976), lawyer (:et)
Jaan Treial (1896–1918), politician
Mai Treial (born 1952), politician
 (born 1945), actress

References

Estonian-language surnames